Statistics of International Soccer League in season 1964.

League standings

Section I

Section II

Championship finals

First leg

Second leg 

Zagłębie Sosnowiec won 5–0 on aggregate.

American Challenge Cup
FK Dukla Prague defeated Zagłębie Sosnowiec 3–1 and 1–1, on goal aggregate.

References 

International Soccer League seasons
International Soccer League, 1964